

Champions

Major League Baseball
World Series: St. Louis Cardinals over Boston Red Sox (4–3); Bob Gibson, MVP
All-Star Game, July 11 at Anaheim Stadium: National League, 2–1 (15 innings); Tony Pérez, MVP

Other champions
College World Series: Arizona State
Japan Series: Yomiuri Giants over Hankyu Braves (4–2)
Little League World Series: West Tokyo, Japan
Senior League World Series: Westbury, New York
Pan American Games: United States over Cuba

Awards and honors
Baseball Hall of Fame
Branch Rickey
Red Ruffing
Lloyd Waner
Most Valuable Player
Carl Yastrzemski, Boston Red Sox, OF (AL)
Orlando Cepeda, St. Louis Cardinals, 1B (NL)
Cy Young Award
Jim Lonborg, Boston Red Sox (AL)
Mike McCormick, San Francisco Giants (NL)
Rookie of the Year
Rod Carew, Minnesota Twins, 2B (AL)
Tom Seaver, New York Mets, P (NL)
Gold Glove Award
George Scott (1B) (AL) 
Bobby Knoop (2B) (AL) 
Brooks Robinson (3B) (AL) 
Jim Fregosi (SS) (AL) 
Paul Blair (OF) (AL) 
Al Kaline (OF) (AL) 
Carl Yastrzemski (OF) (AL)
Bill Freehan (C) (AL) 
Jim Kaat (P) (AL)

Statistical leaders

1American League Triple Crown batting winner.

Major League Baseball Final Standings

American League Final Standings

National League Final Standings

Events

January–April
January 23 – Stan Musial is named General manager of the St. Louis Cardinals.
January 29 – Branch Rickey and Lloyd Waner are elected to the Hall of Fame by a unanimous vote of the Special Veterans Committee.
February 16 – Red Ruffing is selected for the Hall of Fame by the Baseball Writers' Association of America through a special runoff election, since no one received the required 75 percent vote in January.
April 11 – In the season opener, the Chicago Cubs beat the Philadelphia Phillies 4–2 before 16,642 at Wrigley Field. Ferguson Jenkins pitched a complete game and Glenn Beckert hit a home run.
April 14 – In his Major League debut, Billy Rohr of the Boston Red Sox has a no-hitter broken up with two out in the ninth inning—and one strike to go—of a 3–0 victory over the New York Yankees and Whitey Ford at Yankee Stadium. A single by Elston Howard breaks up the bid; this will be the only hit Rohr will allow. Exactly one week later, Rohr again defeats the Yankees in a complete game victory, this time at Fenway Park—the second of: 1) the only two games Rohr will win this season and 2) the only three he will win as a Major Leaguer.
April 16 – At Busch Memorial Stadium, in the St. Louis Cardinals' fourth game of the season, Lou Brock hits two home runs in an 11–8 victory over the Houston Astros. With two home runs against the Los Angeles Dodgers the day before and a fifth against the San Francisco Giants on Opening Day, he becomes the first player to hit five home runs in his team's first four games of the regular season.
April 20 – Tom Seaver earns his first major league victory, 6–1, over the Chicago Cubs.
April 30 – Steve Barber and Stu Miller combine for a no-hitter, but the Detroit Tigers score twice in the ninth on walks, a wild pitch and an error for a 2–1 win over the Baltimore Orioles.

May–July
May 14 – The New York Yankees' Mickey Mantle becomes the 6th member of the 500-home run club in New York's 6–5 victory over the Baltimore Orioles at Yankee Stadium. Mantle connects while batting left-handed off Baltimore's Stu Miller.
May 16 – Carl Yastrzemski hits his 100th career home run in an 8–5 Boston Red Sox loss to the Baltimore Orioles at Fenway Park.
June 7 – Willie Stargell hits his 100th career home run helping Pittsburgh Pirates beat New York Mets 3–0.
June 15 – At the Astrodome, Jimmy Wynn becomes the first Houston Astro to hit three home runs in one game. The shots, all with the bases empty, come in the 4th, 6th and 8th innings of the Astros' 6–2 victory over the San Francisco Giants.
June 18 – At the Astrodome, Don Wilson of the Houston Astros no-hits the Atlanta Braves 2–0, the first no-hitter ever pitched either in a domed stadium or on artificial turf. Along the way, he records 15 strikeouts, including Hank Aaron for the final out.
July 2 – The Chicago Cubs moved into a tie for first place with the St. Louis Cardinals after defeating the Cincinnati Reds 4–1 before 40,464 at Wrigley Field. After the game, many in the crowd waited until the pennant flags on the scoreboard were rearranged with the Cubs flag placed on the top. It was the first time the Cubs were in first place this late in the season since the 1945 season.
July 4 – The Niekro brothers face each other for the first time, with Phil Niekro pitching for the Atlanta Braves and Joe Niekro hurling for the Chicago Cubs. Phil beat Joe in an 8–3 decision in the first game of a double-header in Atlanta. The Braves also won the second game 4–2.
July 11 – At Anaheim Stadium, Tony Pérez ends the longest All-Star Game (15 innings, three hours and 41 minutes) with a home run off Catfish Hunter in a 2–1 National League victory over the American League. Solo homers by Richie Allen and the AL's Brooks Robinson account for the other runs, as Pérez is named MVP.
July 14 – Eddie Mathews of the Houston Astros becomes the seventh member of the 500 home run club. Juan Marichal of the San Francisco Giants serves up the home run;  the first time in history a future Hall of Fame pitcher serves up a 500th home run.
July 25 – The Chicago Cubs lose 4–3 to the St. Louis Cardinals in St. Louis to drop into 2nd place, the Cubs would not regain first place for the rest of 1967.

August
August 2 - The Boston Red Sox obtained Elston Howard from the New York Yankees for cash and two players to be named later. Howard will play a part in the Red Sox winning the 1967 American League pennant.
August 8 - Johnny Callison's two-out single in the 10th inning scored John Briggs from third base and gave the Philadelphia Phillies a 5-4 win over the San Francisco Giants and extended the Phillies winning streak to 8, their longest winning streak since 1963.
August 18 – Tony Conigliaro of the Boston Red Sox is beaned by the California Angels' Jack Hamilton. Hit on the left cheekbone, just below the eye socket, Conigliaro will miss the rest of 1967 and all of 1968. He was hitting .267 with 20 home runs and 67 RBIs in 95 games in 1967. Despite the loss of Tony C., the Red Sox will sweep the four-game series with the Angels. The sweep, however, still leaves the Minnesota Twins in first place, with Boston, the Detroit Tigers and the Chicago White Sox all within two games.
August 20 – In the first game of a double header, Al Kaline hits his 300th career home run helping the Detroit Tigers beat the Cleveland Indians, 4–2.  Kaline has another home run in the second game with Detroit winning, 4–0.
August 25 – Minnesota Twins pitcher Dean Chance no-hits the Cleveland Indians.  He walks five and allows one run.  Nineteen days earlier, Chance throws five perfect innings in a game shortened by rain.
August 28 - The Phillies are in Second Place in the National League as they won their 8th straight win again with a 3-2 win over the Cincinnati Reds. The Phillies won 21 of their last 29 games and finished the season with 82 wins, their last winning season until 1975.

September–December
September 10 – Joe Horlen of the Chicago White Sox no-hits the Detroit Tigers 6–0, in the first game of a doubleheader at Comiskey Park. The White Sox also shut out the Tigers in the nightcap, with Cisco Carlos gaining his first Major League victory, and pull into a third-place tie with the Tigers and within  games of the first-place Minnesota Twins.
September 20 - St Louis Cardinals' pitcher Steve Carlton struck out sixteen Phillies batters in 8 innings, but the Phillies beat Cardinals 3-1.
September 27 – In the tight AL pennant race, the possibility of a four-way tie is eliminated as the Twins and Red Sox both lose (5–1 to California and 6–0 to Cleveland, respectively).  Minnesota now has a 91–69 won-lost record and Boston is 90–70, and the only games left for those two teams are two games against each other.
September 29 – The White Sox lose 1–0 to the Washington Senators and are eliminated from the AL pennant race.  Chicago is now 89–71, and can win a maximum of 91 games, and must finish behind the Twins or the Red Sox (those two teams only have the two games against each other left to play).  The only remaining tie possibilities are Twins-Tigers or Red Sox-Tigers.
Ferguson Jenkins wins his 20th game of the 1967 season with a 4–1 decision over the Cincinnati Reds in Cincinnati. It was the first of seven 20-win seasons for Jenkins in his career, six of which were with the Cubs.
October 1:
One of the closest American League pennant races ever enters the season's final day with the Red Sox and Twins tied for first place and the Tigers one-half game back. The Red Sox and Twins play a game against each other, with the winner clinching a tie for the pennant and the loser being eliminated. In that game, eventual American League MVP Carl Yastrzemski goes 4 for 4 as the Red Sox beat the Twins 5–3. The Tigers can tie the Red Sox if they sweep a doubleheader from the California Angels in Detroit. The Tigers win the first game 6–4, but their bullpen fails in the finale and the Angels win 8–5 to give the Red Sox the pennant with no playoff.
Today's doubleheader is the second in as many days for the Tigers and the Angels.  The doubleheaders are the result of earlier postponements of games which are needed in the deciding of the pennant race.  Many years later, also in the AL, there will be a case of a day doubleheader scheduled on the day after a twi-night doubleheader; there will be a player protest to AL president Bobby Brown, who will rule that there will be only one game on the second day.
For the first time since 1937 both Chicago teams succeed in winning at least 85 games during the regular season.  For the Cubs it was only their 2nd winning season (1963 being the other one) since 1946.
In the Minnesota Twins' loss today (to Boston), their third baseman, César Tovar, sets an American League season record by playing in 164 games. Maury Wills holds the NL record at 165 (1962).
October 5 – In Game 2 of the World Series, Boston's Jim Lonborg is brilliant as he retires the first 19 Cardinals before walking Curt Flood with one out in the seventh inning. His no-hit bid is broken up with two out in the eighth by a Julián Javier double. Lonborg has to settle for pitching the fourth one-hitter in World Series history as the Red Sox even the series with a 5–0 win.
October 12 – In Game Seven of the World Series, the St. Louis Cardinals earn their second World Championship of the decade with a 7–2 victory over pitcher Jim Lonborg and the Boston Red Sox. Pitcher Bob Gibson notches his third win in the Series with a three-hitter, in which he records 10 strikeouts and a fifth-inning home run, while outfielder Lou Brock has two hits and three stolen bases for a record seven steals in a seven-game World Series. 
October 18: City officials from Kansas City, Oakland and Seattle were invited by Joe Cronin to discuss the A's relocation plans. United States Senator Stuart Symington attended the meeting and discussed the possibility of revoking baseball's antitrust exemption if the A's were allowed to leave Kansas City. The owners began deliberation and after the first ballot, only six owners were in favour of relocation. The owner of Baltimore voted against, while the ownership for Cleveland, New York and Washington had abstained. In the second ballot, the New York Yankees voted in favour of the Athletics relocation to Oakland. To appease all interested parties, the Athletics announced that MLB would expand to Kansas City and Seattle no later than the 1971 MLB season.
October 22 – Kansas City Athletics owner Charlie Finley hires Hall of Famer Joe DiMaggio as the team's vice president. DiMaggio will also serve as a coach for the newly transplanted Oakland Athletics. DiMaggio needed two more years of baseball service to qualify for the league's maximum pension allowance.
November 22 – Minnesota Twins second baseman Rod Carew wins the American League Rookie of the Year Award. Receiving 19 of 20 first place votes, Carew easily outdistances Reggie Smith of the Boston Red Sox.
November 29 – The Chicago White Sox reacquire SS Luis Aparicio, along with OF Russ Snyder and 1B/OF John Matias, from the Baltimore Orioles, in exchange for pitchers Bruce Howard and Roger Nelson and IF Don Buford.

Births

January
January 3 – Jimmy Rogers
January 4 – Ted Wood
January 4 – Clint Zavaras
January 5 – Chris Nabholz
January 7 – Rob Maurer
January 8 – Matt Maysey
January 8 – Randy Nosek
January 10 – Kevin Baez
January 11 – Nikco Riesgo
January 12 – Mike Simms
January 14 – Paul Fletcher
January 15 – Bill Wertz
January 22 – Kevin Higgins
January 26 – Jeff Branson
January 26 – Tim Pugh

February
February 1 – Juan Guerrero
February 1 – Tim Naehring
February 1 – Hiromoto Okubo
February 9 – Todd Pratt
February 11 – John Patterson
February 11 – Scott Pose
February 13 – Eddie Pye
February 17 – Lonnie Maclin
February 18 – John Valentin
February 18 – Matt Turner
February 19 – Keith Kessinger
February 20 – Kurt Knudsen
February 26 – David Howard
February 26 – Scott Service

March
March 8 – Lance Barksdale
March 8 – Joel Johnston
March 9 – Vince Horsman
March 11 – Dwayne Hosey
March 15 – Bobby Rose
March 16 – Don Florence
March 18 – Ken Edenfield
March 23 – Jerry Brooks
March 25 – Brian Barnes
March 26 – Jarvis Brown
March 26 – Shawn Hare
March 27 – Jaime Navarro
March 27 – Candy Sierra
March 28 – Shawn Boskie
March 28 – Larry Gonzales
March 29 – Brian Jordan
March 29 – Gerónimo Peña

April
April 3 – Miguel García
April 3 – Danilo León
April 5 – Greg Smith
April 6 – Tommy Greene
April 8 – Rich Batchelor
April 9 – Graeme Lloyd
April 10 – Mike Humphreys
April 14 – Mike Trombley
April 17 – Marquis Grissom
April 18 – Brian Dubois
April 20 – Greg Brummett
April 23 – Rhéal Cormier
April 24 – Omar Vizquel
April 25 – Mike Sarbaugh
April 27 – Tony Eusebio

May
May 5 – Charles Nagy
May 12 – Kenny Greer
May 15 – John Smoltz
May 16 – Doug Brocail
May 16 – Frank Seminara
May 18 – Eric Young
May 19 – Turk Wendell
May 24 – Carlos Hernández
May 26 – Stacy Jones
May 29 – Bill Risley
May 31 – Kenny Lofton
May 31 – Bill Miller

June
June 1 – James Hurst
June 2 – Mike Stanton
June 4 – Scott Servais
June 4 – Rick Wilkins
June 5 – Ray Lankford
June 6 – Ken Ramos
June 8 – Steve Chitren
June 11 – John Doherty
June 13 – Daren Brown
June 14 – Jerry Spradlin
June 14 – George Tsamis
June 14 – Brian Turang
June 23 – Hensley Meulens
June 27 – Lee Hancock
June 28 – Matt Karchner
June 28 – Ron Witmeyer
June 29 – John Wehner

July
July 3 – Brian Cashman
July 4 – Vinny Castilla
July 5 – Tim Worrell
July 6 – Omar Olivares
July 10 – Lee Stevens
July 11 – Andy Ashby
July 11 – Donne Wall
July 13 – Pat Rapp
July 14 – Robin Ventura
July 21 – Lance Painter
July 25 – Ed Sprague

August
August 1 – Gregg Jefferies
August 2 – Scott Taylor
August 4 – Steve Bieser
August 7 – Jason Grimsley
August 8 – Kevin Belcher
August 8 – Matt Whiteside
August 9 – Deion Sanders
August 10 – Chuck Carr
August 14 – Joe Grahe
August 15 – Mike James
August 16 – Bret Barberie
August 17 – Kelly Mann
August 19 – Scott Fredrickson
August 20 – Andy Benes
August 22 – Bill Welke
August 25 – Euclides Rojas
August 26 – Shinji Sasaoka
August 27 – Brian McRae
August 27 – Willie Smith
August 28 – Darren Lewis
August 31 – Stan Royer

September
September 2 – Jamie McAndrew
September 3 – Luis González
September 12 – Pat Listach
September 13 – Rod Correia
September 15 – Paul Abbott
September 15 – Dennis Moeller
September 16 – John Ericks
September 19 – Jim Abbott
September 22 – John Briscoe
September 22 – P. J. Forbes
September 22 – Matt Howard
September 22 – Doug Lindsey
September 26 – Brian Traxler
September 29 – Dave Silvestri
September 30 – John DeSilva
September 30 – Yorkis Pérez

October
October 1 – Chuck McElroy
October 3 – Junior Félix
October 4 – Roger Pavlik
October 5 – Rey Sánchez
October 8 – J. T. Bruett
October 9 – Jim Tatum
October 12 – Mike DiMuro
October 12 – Ray DiMuro
October 13 – Scott Cooper
October 13 – Monty Fariss
October 13 – Trevor Hoffman
October 14 – Dave Hajek
October 14 – Pat Kelly
October 15 – Carlos García
October 16 – Josías Manzanillo
October 17 – Mark Johnson
October 20 – Harvey Pulliam
October 21 – John Flaherty
October 24 – F. P. Santangelo
October 25 – Joe Siddall
October 26 – Rafael Novoa
October 29 – Narciso Elvira
October 29 – Greg Gohr
October 29 – Mandy Romero

November
November 1 – Carlos Rodríguez
November 4 – Chris Bushing
November 4 – Eric Karros
November 4 – Jon Shave
November 4 – Ryan Thompson
November 5 – Brian Raabe
November 7 – Dave Wainhouse
November 8 – Eric Anthony
November 8 – Henry Rodríguez
November 11 – Jose Munoz
November 11 – Noe Muñoz
November 12 – Donald Harris
November 12 – Mark Small
November 14 – Paul Wagner
November 15 – Pedro Borbón
November 18 – Tom Gordon
November 19 – Gary DiSarcina
November 20 – Alex Arias
November 21 – Darron Cox
November 21 – Tripp Cromer
November 24 – Cal Eldred
November 24 – Al Martin
November 24 – Ben McDonald
November 29 – Bob Hamelin

December
December 1 – Reggie Sanders
December 5 – Matt Grott
December 6 – Kevin Appier
December 7 – Tino Martínez
December 8 – Tom McGraw
December 13 – Mike Mordecai
December 15 – Mo Vaughn
December 17 – Steve Parris
December 17 – Rafael Valdez
December 19 – Doug Johns
December 26 – Esteban Beltré
December 30 – Archie Corbin
December 30 – Tim Timmons

Deaths

January
January 1 – Lindsay Brown, 55, shortstop who appeared in 48 games for the 1937 Brooklyn Dodgers.
January 4 – Estel Crabtree, 63, outfielder who appeared in 489 total games for the Cincinnati Reds (1929; 1931–1932; 1943–1944) and St. Louis Cardinals (1933; 1941–1942); stalwart member of 1930s Rochester Red Wings teams; elected to the International League Hall of Fame (1953). 
January 6 – Joe Haynes, 49, pitcher who hurled in 379 career games for the Washington Senators and Chicago White Sox from 1939 through 1952; American League earned-run average champion (1947) and All-Star (1948); from 1953, a coach and executive with Washington and the Minnesota Twins; brother-in-law of Calvin Griffith.
January 6 – Johnny Keane, 55, manager of the St. Louis Cardinals (July 6, 1961 through 1964) and New York Yankees (1965 to May 6, 1966) who won the 1964 World Series with the Cardinals, then joined the opposing Yankees immediately afterward; previously, longtime minor league infielder and manager before his promotion to Cardinals as a coach in 1959.
January 6 – Joe Walsh, 80, catcher who appeared in five games for the New York Highlanders in 1910 and 1911.
January 13 – Charlie Gelbert, 60, infielder for the St. Louis Cardinals, Cincinnati Reds, Detroit Tigers, Washington Senators and Boston Red Sox between 1929 and 1940, who helped the 1931 Cardinals win the World Series.
January 18 – Goose Tatum, 45 or 48, legendary basketball player for the Harlem Globetrotters who also was a first baseman/outfielder for Birmingham, Cincinnati and Indianapolis of the Negro American League between 1941 and 1948. 
January 25 – Jud Daley, 82, outfielder in 80 games for the 1911–1912 Brooklyn Dodgers.
January 25 – George Gibson, 86, catcher in 1,213 games over 14 seasons for the Pittsburgh Pirates (1905–1916) and New York Giants (1917–1918); manager of Pirates (1920–1922 and 1932–1934) and interim pilot of Chicago Cubs (1925); one of the first Canadians to manage  in the major leagues; member of Canada's Sports Hall of Fame and the Canadian Baseball Hall of Fame.

February
February 4 – Earle Mack, 77, son of Connie Mack; first baseman, third baseman and catcher in five total games for the Philadelphia Athletics (1910, 1911 and 1914); minor league player and player-manager (1910–1917 and 1920–1923); coach and assistant manager (to his father) for the Athletics from 1924 to May 1950; co-owner of the Athletics with his brother Roy from August 1950 to November 1954, when the Mack brothers sold the team to industrialist Arnold Johnson, who moved it from Philadelphia to Kansas City in 1955.
February 7 – Joe Vitelli, 58, pitcher who worked in four contests for the wartime 1944 Pittsburgh Pirates.
February 9 – Billy Burke, 77, left-handed pitcher in 22 games for Boston of the National League in 1910 and 1911.
February 10 – Betty Whiting, 41, who played at first base for seven different teams of the All-American Girls Professional Baseball League in a span of nine years.
February 12 – Dutch Distel, 70, played in eight games for the St. Louis Cardinals in 1918, mostly as a second baseman.
February 12 – Bob Rhoads, 87, pitcher for the Chicago Cubs, Cleveland Indians, and St. Louis Cardinals in the early 20th century, who won 22 games and posted a 1.80 ERA for Cleveland in 1906.
February 14 – Jimmy Johnston, 77, infielder-outfielder in 1,377 games for the Chicago White Sox (1911) and Cubs (1914), Brooklyn Robins (1916–1925), Boston Braves (1926) and New York Giants (1926); played for Brooklyn's 1916 and 1920 NL champions; later a coach with the Brooklyn Dodgers.
February 21 – Lou Tost, 55, left-handed pitcher who worked in 38 games for the 1942–1943 Boston Braves and one contest for the 1947 Pittsburgh Pirates.
February 23 – Chaney White, 72, outfielder who played in 598 games in the Negro leagues over 11 seasons between 1920 and 1936, batting .321 lifetime.
February 26 – Tommy Heath, 53, catcher in 134 games for St. Louis Browns (1935; 1937–1938); later a minor league manager and MLB scout.

March
March 1 – Claude Grier, 62, left-hander who pitched in 72 career games for Washington, Wilmington and Atlantic City of the Eastern Colored League between 1924 and 1927; led 1926 ECL in complete games with 19 in 20 games started.
March 4 – Bullet Rogan, 73, standout pitcher for the Kansas City Monarchs, elected to the Baseball Hall of Fame in 1998; went 120–52 (2.65) over 12 seasons between 1920 and 1935; twice led Negro National League in games won and shutouts, and also led NNL in complete games three times and winning percentage and earned run average once each.
March 6 – Vince Castino, 49, catcher who appeared in 88 games for the Chicago White Sox from 1943 to 1945.
March 6 – Jack Meyer, 34, pitcher who worked in 202 games for the 1955–1961 Philadelphia Phillies.
March 7 – Johnie Scott, 53, outfielder for the Birmingham Black Barons and Kansas City Monarchs of the Negro American League between 1944 and 1948, appearing in 165 games.
March 7 – Al Shealy, 66, pitcher who hurled in 47 total games for 1928 New York Yankees and 1930 Chicago Cubs; member of 1928 world champions.
March 10 – Billy Orr, 75, shortstop in 40 games for the 1913–1914 Philadelphia Athletics.
March 26 – George F. Wilson, 77, catcher who appeared in five games for the 1911 Detroit Tigers and one contest for the 1914 Boston Red Sox.
March 30 – Ivan Howard, 84, infielder in 102 games for the 1914–1915 St. Louis Browns and 1917–1918 Cleveland Indians.

April
April 1 – Halley Harding, 62, shortstop/outfielder who played in 380 Negro National League games (1926–1931 and 1937), primarily for the Kansas City Monarchs and Detroit Stars.
April 7 – Shanty Hogan, 61, hard-hitting, heavyweight catcher for the Boston Braves, New York Giants and Washington Senators, who played in 989 games between 1925 and 1936.
April 13  – Tommy Griffith, 77, outfielder who appeared in 1,401 games between 1913 and 1925 for the Boston Braves, Cincinnati Reds, Brooklyn Robins and Chicago Cubs; played in all seven games of the 1920 World Series, starting six as the Robins' right fielder.
April 13 – Herb Welch, 66, shortstop who played 13 games for the 1925 Boston Red Sox.
April 22 – Fritz Maisel, 77, third baseman and second baseman for New York Yankees (1913–1917) and St. Louis Browns (1918); led American League in stolen bases (74) in 1914.
April 22 – Bill Salkeld, 50, catcher who hit for the cycle as a rookie for the 1945 Pittsburgh Pirates and was also a member of the 1948 National League champion Boston Braves.
April 29 – Johnny Butler, 74, shortstop-third baseman in 375 games for the Brooklyn Robins, Chicago Cubs and St. Louis Cardinals between 1926 and 1929.

May
May 8 – Ossie Orwoll, 66, first baseman and left-handed pitcher who played in 94 games for the Philadelphia Athletics in 1928 and 1929.
May 13 – Eddie Pick, 68, played in 66 games, primarily as a third baseman, for the 1923–1924 Cincinnati Reds and 1927 Chicago Cubs.
May 14 – Vic Saier, 76, first baseman for the Chicago Cubs from 1911–1917 and Pittsburgh Pirates in 1919; led National League in triples with 21 in 1913.
May 19 – Jiggs Parson, 81, pitcher with Boston of the National League who worked in 17 games in 1910 and 1911.
May 20 – Senaida Wirth, 40, All-Star shortstop in the All-American Girls Professional Baseball League.
May 26 – Bud Davis, 71, pitcher in 17 games for horrible (43–109) Philadelphia Athletics of 1915; became full-time outfielder after 1920 in minor leagues, where he batted .331 lifetime, including .400 in 1924.

June
June 6 – Otis Brannan, 68, second baseman in 158 career games for the 1928–1929 St. Louis Browns.
June 13 – Doug Baird, 75, outfielder-third baseman who appeared in 617 games between 1915 and 1920 for the Pittsburgh Pirates, St. Louis Cardinals, Philadelphia Phillies, Brooklyn Robins and New York Giants.
June 13 – Dick Reichle, 70, outfielder who played in 128 games in 1922 and 1923 for the Boston Red Sox; first visiting player to hit a home run at Yankee Stadium (April 20, 1923, off Waite Hoyt)—and it was Reichle's only MLB homer.
June 15 – Rip Wade, 59, outfielder in 59 games for the 1923 Washington Senators.
June 16 – Dutch Holland, 63, outfielder who appeared in 102 career games for the Boston Braves and Cleveland Indians between 1932 and 1934.
June 23 – Al Bashang, 78, outfielder who played in 18 MLB games for the 1912 Detroit Tigers and 1918 Brooklyn Robins.
June 23 – Tookie Gilbert, 38, first baseman and minor-league slugger who appeared in 183 games during 1950 and 1953 stints with the New York Giants; his father and brother also played in the major leagues.
June 24 – Roy Castleton, 81, southpaw who pitched in 11 total games divided amongst the 1907 New York Highlanders and the 1909–1910 Cincinnati Reds.
June 30 – Hap Myers, 80, first baseman for the 1910–11 Boston Red Sox, 1911 St. Louis Browns, 1913 Boston Braves and 1914–1915 Brooklyn Tip-Tops (of the "outlaw" Federal League); appeared in 377 games in all.

July
July 6 – Jim Asbell, 53, outfielder who played 17 games for the 1938 Chicago Cubs.
July 6 – Cotton Knaupp, 77, shortstop who played in 31 games for the 1910–1911 Cleveland Naps.
July 7 – Joe Weiss, 73, first baseman for the 1915 Chicago Whales (Federal League).
July 10 – Art "Skinny" Graham, 57, outfielder who got into 21 games for the Boston Red Sox in 1934 and 1935.
July 13 – Art "The Great" Shires, 60, colorful first baseman (and would-be prizefighter) who batted .291 in 290 career games for the Chicago White Sox (1928–1930), Washington Senators (1930) and Boston Braves (1932).
July 21 – Jimmie Foxx, 59, Hall of Fame first baseman (Philadelphia Athletics, Boston Red Sox, Chicago Cubs and Philadelphia Phillies) between 1925 and 1945, who retired with more career home runs (534) than any player except Babe Ruth; a 3-time MVP and the AL's 1933 triple crown winner, he hit .325 lifetime and played in the first nine All-Star games.
July 25 – Mike Chartak, 51, outfielder and first baseman who got into 256 career games for the New York Yankees (1940 and 1942), Washington Senators (1942) and St. Louis Browns (1942–1944); played for the Browns in the 1944 World Series.
July 29 – Ray Kolp, 72, pitcher who logged 383 appearances in a 12-season MLB career with the St. Louis Browns (1921–1924) and Cincinnati Reds (1927–1934).

August
August 13 – Mike Hechinger, 77, catcher in 13 games for Chicago Cubs and Brooklyn Superbas in 1912–1913.
August 17 – Ray Caldwell, 79, spitball pitcher who won 134 games over 12 seasons spent with the New York Highlanders and Yankees (1910–1918), Boston Red Sox (1919) and Cleveland Indians (1919–1921); knocked unconscious on the pitcher's mound when he was struck by lightning during the ninth inning of an August 24, 1919, game while with Cleveland, but he stayed in the contest after being revived and hurled a complete-game, 2–1 victory; no-hit the Yankees two weeks later, on September 10; won 20 games the following year as a member of the 1920 World Series champion Indians.
August 19 – George Walker, 52, pitcher in the Negro leagues between 1937 and 1943, most prominently for the Kansas City Monarchs; led Negro American League in wins and winning percentage in 1939 and in earned run average in both 1940 and 1941.
August 21 – Slim McGrew, 68, a -tall,  pitcher who took the mound for ten games over three seasons (1922–1924) for the Washington Senators.
August 25 – Emmett Nelson, 62, pitcher in 25 total games for 1934–1935 Cincinnati Reds.
August 29 – Joe Fitzgerald, 70, minor league catcher who became a coach for the Washington Senators (1944–1957); scouted for the Senators and Minnesota Twins from 1958 until his death.

September
September 2 – Jack Ryan, 62, outfielder who appeared in two games for the 1929 Boston Red Sox.
September 3 – Floyd Kranson, 54, pitcher/outfielder in 46 total games for three Negro American League clubs, principally the Kansas City Monarchs, between 1937 and 1940.
September 4 – Hugh Canavan, 70, left-hander who pitched in 11 games for the 1918 Boston Braves.
September 4 – George Loepp, 65, center fielder who appeared in 65 career games for the 1928 Boston Red Sox and 1930 Washington Senators.
September 4 – Clyde Manion, 70, catcher who appeared in 477 games over 13 seasons for the Detroit Tigers (1920–1924 and 1926–1927), St. Louis Browns (1928–1930) and Cincinnati Reds (1930–1934).
September 5 – Jack Tising, 63, pitcher in 19 pro seasons between 1924 and 1946 who played only ten games in the majors for the 1936 Pittsburgh Pirates.
September 12 – Rollie Zeider, 83, infielder for three Chicago franchises (White Sox, Whales and Cubs), as well as the New York Yankees, from 1910 to 1918; played in 941 career big-league contests.
September 13 – Ralph LaPointe, 45, shortstop and second baseman who played 143 total games for 1947 Philadelphia Phillies and 1948 St. Louis Cardinals; head baseball coach of the University of Vermont from 1952 until his death.
September 13 – Joe Stanley, 86, outfielder for four major-league teams over seven seasons between 1897 and 1909, including both the National League (1897) and American League (1902 and 1905–1906) versions of the Washington Senators.
September 14 – Walt Bond, 29, outfielder who played 365 career games in all or part of six seasons for the Cleveland Indians, Houston Colt .45s/Astros and Minnesota Twins between April 1960 and May 1967, when leukemia forced him to retire.
September 16 – Lee King, 74, outfielder in 411 games for the Pittsburgh Pirates, Philadelphia Phillies and New York Giants from 1916 to 1922; in his final MLB at bat, in the eighth inning of Game 5 of the 1922 World Series, drove in an insurance run with a single to cap a three-run rally in the Giants' clinching, 5–3 victory over the New York Yankees. 
September 17 – Karl Adams, 76, pitcher who worked in 30 career games for the 1914 Cincinnati Reds and 1915 Chicago Cubs.
September 23 – Mose Offutt, 67, southpaw who pitched in 20 games in 1925 for Indianapolis of the Negro National League.
September 25 – Phil Geier, 90, outfielder who played for five teams between 1896 and 1904, appearing in 349 games.
September 27 – Frank Barnes, 67, left-handed hurler who worked in six total games for the 1929 Detroit Tigers and 1930 New York Yankees.
September 28 – Bill Powell, 82, pitcher in 17 games for three National League clubs, primarily the Pittsburgh Pirates, between 1909 and 1913.

October
October 2 – Orville Armbrust, 59, pitcher who fashioned a spotless 1–0 record and a 2.13 ERA over three games in his only MLB trial with the Washington Senators in September 1934.
October 2 – Jackie Price, 54, professional baseball shortstop during the 1930s and 1940s who became famous for sideline comedy, stunts and clowning that entertained fans before and during games; signed as a fan attraction by Cleveland Indians owner Bill Veeck in 1946 and activated for seven August and September games; his clowning skills were showcased in the MGM film Diamond Demon (1947).
October 2 – Bull Wagner, 79, stocky relief pitcher who appeared in 24 games for Brooklyn of the National League in 1913–1914.
October 3 – Fritz Mollwitz, 77, German-born first baseman who played in 634 games between 1913 and 1917 for the Chicago Cubs, Cincinnati Reds, Pittsburgh Pirates and St. Louis Cardinals.
October 4 – Ed Barney, 77, outfielder in 88 career games for the 1915 New York Yankees and 1915–1916 Pittsburgh Pirates.
October 13 – Joe Cates, 62, infielder who played in 28 games for the 1931 Louisville White Sox of the Negro National League.
October 17 – Louise Clapp, 33,  All-American Girls Professional Baseball League pitcher.
October 19 – Art Garibaldi, 60, third baseman and second baseman who played in 71 games for the 1936 St. Louis Cardinals; a fixture in the Pacific Coast League, playing 11 PCL seasons in the 12 years from 1931 to 1942.
October 22 – Oscar Givens, 45, infielder who played in 19 games over three seasons (1939, 1946, 1948) for the Newark Eagles of the Negro National League.
October 27 – Bill Bailey, 85, outfielder who appeared in five games for 1911 New York Highlanders.

November
November 1 – Frank Gabler, 55, pitcher who worked in 113 games for the New York Giants, Boston Bees and Chicago White Sox between 1935 and 1938; later, longtime scout and pitching instructor.
November 2 – Clem Clemens, 81, catcher who appeared in 34 career games for the 1914–1915 Chicago Whales (Federal League) and the 1916 Chicago Cubs.
November 2 – Frank Wickware, 79, fireballing pitcher in the Negro leagues whose career extended from 1909 to 1925 and who wore the uniforms of over a dozen teams.
November 4 – Tom Lanning, 60, left-handed hurler who appeared in three games for the 1938 Philadelphia Phillies.
November 12 – Cleo Carlyle, 65, outfielder who played in 95 games for the Boston Red Sox in 1927.
November 18 – Mike Prendergast, 78, pitcher for Chicago of the "outlaw" Federal League (1914–1915), Chicago Cubs (1916–1917) and Philadelphia Phillies (1918–1919) who worked in 180 career games.
November 24 – Joe Kelly, 67, outfielder, first baseman and pinch hitter who played in 97 games for 1926 and 1928 Chicago Cubs.

December
December 5 – Jack Lively, 82, pitcher who posted a 7–5 record in 18 games for 1911 Detroit Tigers.
December 6 – Claude Sullivan, 42, member of the Cincinnati Reds' radio broadcast team since 1964, and lead play-by-play announcer from 1966 until his death.
December 7 – George V. McLaughlin, 80, banker; as president of the Brooklyn Trust Company, he played a pivotal behind-the-scenes role in the ownership of the Dodgers in the 1930s and 1940s; brought both Branch Rickey and Walter O'Malley into management/ownership posts, with O'Malley ultimately becoming the majority owner who masterminded the team's transfer to Los Angeles after the 1957 season.
December 19 – Walter Tappan, 77, shortstop/third baseman in 18 games for the 1914 Kansas City Packers (Federal League).
December 27 – Paul Lehner, 47, outfielder in 540 games for the St. Louis Browns, Philadelphia Athletics, Chicago White Sox, Cleveland Indians and Boston Red Sox between 1946 and 1952.
December 28 – James M. Johnston, 72, co-owner and board chairman of the Washington Senators from January 29, 1963 until his death.
December 28 – Bill Pertica, 69, pitcher for the Boston Red Sox (1918) and St. Louis Cardinals (1921–1923); appeared in 74 career games, 73 as a Cardinal.
December 31 – Shovel Hodge, 74, Chicago White Sox pitcher from 1920 to 1922, who worked in 75 MLB games.

References